Dharmasoka College is a coed school in Sri Lanka. The college was established in 1913.

It was supported by the Buddhist Theosophical Society led by Colonel Henry Steel Olcott, and accordingly is one of Sri Lanka's oldest schools. It provides primary and secondary education.

Location and size
Dharmasoka College is situated in Ambalangoda within the administrative district of Galle, Sri Lanka. It currently has over 5,500 students and approximately 250 members of the academic staff.

History
In 1913, the college was established with fifteen students by its founder, Mudliar Santiago Thomas de Silva, who spent his own wealth to establish and develop the college.

On 10 April 1929, the Sugatha Sasanodaya Samithiya (a benevolent society) took over administration of the college. The government of Sri Lanka took control of the college in 1961. Some managers under Sugatha Sasanodaya Samithiya were P. de S. Kularatne, Dr. M. H Saddhasena and L. C. de Silva, all were former Members of Parliament.

Approximately 150 students are selected to the local universities in each year.

Dharmasoka College students are called Sokians.

Notable alumni 

 Mahinda Deshapriya, former chairman of the Election Commission of Sri Lanka '''
 Sarath Fonseka (Field Marshal), Former Commander of the Sri Lanka Army(GENERAL), Former Chief of the Defence Staff, Presidential Candidate in 2010(lose), Member of Parliament for Colombo District, Cabinet Minister for Regional Development.
 Rohana Wijeweera, Presidential Candidate in 1982, Founder of the Janatha Vimukthi Peramuna, Leader of the 1971 JVP Insurrection and 1987–89 JVP Insurrection
 Jayalath Weerakkody, Former Air Force Commander and Former Sri Lankan High Commissioner to Pakistan
 Upul Tharanga, Test/ODI Cricketer
 Dinesh Chandimal, Test/ODI Cricketer
 Gunadasa Kapuge, Veternent Musician
 C. P. de Silva, Former Civil Servant, Former Cabinet Minister
 Sunil Handunnetti, Member of Parliament for Colombo District
 Buddhika Kurukularatne, journalist and former Member of Parliament for Galle District
 Shan Wijayalal De Silva, Chief Minister of Southern Province of Sri Lanka
 L. H. Sumanadasa, Vice Chancellor of the University of Ceylon and founder of the University of Moratuwa
 Ajit de Silva, Former Test cricketer
 Saman Jayantha, Former National Cricketer
 Admiral Piyal De Silva, Commander, Sri Lanka Navy.

...

References 

1913 establishments in Ceylon
Buddhist schools in Sri Lanka
Educational institutions established in 1913
Buildings and structures in Ambalangoda
Schools in Galle District